Advisory Council elections were held in Northern Rhodesia in February 1922. Candidates opposed to amalgamation with Southern Rhodesia received 1,117 votes, whilst candidates supportive of the proposal received 310.

Electoral system
Northern Rhodesia was split into two constituencies, North-Western Rhodesia (four seats) and North-Eastern Rhodesia (one seat). Voting was restricted to British subjects over the age of 21 who had lived in the territory for at least six months and owned at least £150 of property. A total of 679 voters registered in North-Western Rhodesia.

Results
In North-Western Rhodesia a total of 569 votes were cast, of which four were invalid.

References

1922 in Northern Rhodesia
1922
1922 elections in Africa
1922 elections in the British Empire